Connor Jackson Braid (born May 31, 1990) is a Canadian rugby union player. Braid is capable of playing at fly-half, in the centres or in the back three for XVs. In VIIs Braid's preferred position is at prop.

Career
At the start of the 2014–15 season Braid signed an initial 3-month contract with Glasgow Warriors. This contract was extended although he was sent to London Scottish in December 2014 on loan with an agreement that he could return for cover during the 2015 Six Nations tournament. However, at the end of the Six Nations Glasgow Warriors announced that Braid would stay with the Pro 12 club until the end of the season.

Braid is now playing professionally with Canada 7s.

In June 2021, Braid was named to Canada's 2020 Summer Olympics team.

References

External links
 
 
 
 
 
 
 
 
 Rugby Canada Rosters Profile

1990 births
Living people
Canada international rugby union players
Canadian rugby union players
Rugby union centres
Sportspeople from Victoria, British Columbia
Canada international rugby sevens players
Glasgow Warriors players
World Games bronze medalists
Competitors at the 2013 World Games
Rugby sevens players at the 2014 Commonwealth Games
Commonwealth Games rugby sevens players of Canada
Rugby sevens players at the 2020 Summer Olympics
Olympic rugby sevens players of Canada